Cape St. Marys is a headland located at the western tip of the Nova Scotia peninsula in the Canadian province of Nova Scotia.

Cape St. Marys is not the westernmost point in the province as the two islands comprising the Digby Neck, Long Island and Brier Island, lie further west.

References
Cape St. Marys on Destination Nova Scotia

St. Marys
Landforms of Digby County, Nova Scotia